Manuel Mandel (30 September 1936 – 27 September 2009) was a Brazilian rower. He competed at the 1980 Summer Olympics and the 1984 Summer Olympics.

References

External links
 

1936 births
2009 deaths
Brazilian male rowers
Olympic rowers of Brazil
Rowers at the 1980 Summer Olympics
Rowers at the 1984 Summer Olympics
Rowers from Rio de Janeiro (city)
Pan American Games medalists in rowing
Pan American Games gold medalists for Brazil
Rowers at the 1971 Pan American Games
Medalists at the 1971 Pan American Games